EK Engelmann Wien was an ice hockey team in Vienna, Austria. They played in the Austrian Hockey League, the top level of ice hockey in Austria.

History

The club was founded in 1922 as Pötzleinsdorfer SK. Wien won five Austrian (one as Pötzleinsdorfer SK) titles, and one German title, in 1939, as Austria was occupied by Germany at the time.

Achievements
Austrian champion (5) :1932 (as Pötzleinsdorfer SK), 1938, 1946, 1956, 1957
German champion (1) : 1939

References

Defunct ice hockey teams in Austria
Former Austrian Hockey League teams
Ice hockey clubs established in 1922
Sport in Vienna
1922 establishments in Austria